Sergei Mikhailov (born February 7, 1958),  nickname Mikhas, is a Russian businessman and leader of the  Solntsevskaya Bratva criminal syndicate.

Mikhailov was originally a waiter, but moved into the criminal world in 1987 after a conviction for fraud in 1984. Together with Viktor Averin, Mikhas formed the Solntsevo group in the late 1980s, where he was born and raised.

François Tharin, a Vaud immigration attorney, who was the former head of the Cantonial Office of Foreigners obtained both Mikhailov's proper immigration papers and Vaud approval in January 1996 after Mikhailov had purchased a 800,000 Swiss franc villa in Borex, Vaud, at the end of 1995 through an intermediary Vaud industrialist. Mikhailov had been referred to Tharin from his business friends André Milowanow and Olivier Demaurex of the financial firm SCFI Holding, whose offices are along avenue CF Ramuz in Pully, and had arranged for the Line SA company in Penthalaz to improve Moscow's water lines.

On 16 October 1996, Mikhas was arrested in at the Cointrin Airport, Geneva, Switzerland on charges of false documents and a law about foreigners owning property. He was later acquitted and allowed to walk free from the court after spending two years in jail waiting for the trial. One of the witnesses, Vadim Rosenbaum who was chairman of the Fund cooperative, was shot dead in Amsterdam before Rosenbaum could testify.

During the Swiss trial in Geneva, Mikhailov's attorney in Switzerland was Ralph Oswald Isenegger and in Russia was Sergei Pogramkov.

Notes

References

1958 births
Living people
Russian gangsters
Russian crime bosses
Russian people imprisoned abroad
Prisoners and detainees of Switzerland